William Percy Sherman (27 July 1909 – 4 May 1975) was an Australian rules footballer who played with Footscray in the Victorian Football League (VFL).

Bill was the brother of Jack Sherman and Ted Sherman.

Notes

External links 

1909 births
1975 deaths
Australian rules footballers from Victoria (Australia)
Western Bulldogs players
Yarraville Football Club players